This is a list of audio releases in the Transformers media franchise.

The Transformers: The Movie music

Original Motion Picture Soundtrack

Til All Are One

Til All Are One is a soundtrack that contains musical compositions from The Transformers: The Movie. The release is a 2-CD set, the first contains tracks from Stan Bush Call to Action album. The second CD contains the whole music score of The Transformers: The Movie (minus the three score pieces featured in the Motion Picture soundtrack release).  It was released by 3H Enterprises as a BotCon '97 exclusive but after the album sold out in a short few months the album was reissued for BotCon '98. The song "Ground Zero" was rewritten and re-recorded by Bush as "Till All Are One" for his 2007 album In This Life. This newer version was used as the ending theme of the 2010 video game Transformers: War for Cybertron.

Disc One (Stan Bush: Call to Action):
 The Touch (1997 Remix)
 Never Surrender [1997 Remix]
 Hold Your Head Up High
 Straight to the Top
 Dare (1997 Remix)
 Critical Mass [featuring Vince DiCola]
 Ground Zero (BotCon Theme)
 Capture the Dream
 Total Surrender
 Highest Calling

Disc Two (Vince DiCola: The Transformers: The Movie musical score):
 Unicron's Theme
 Transformers: The Movie Main Title (Alternate)
 2005
 More Luck Than You Imagine
 Attack on the Shuttle
 Gone Fishin'
 City Under Siege
 Showdown
 Witness to a Funeral
 Contest for Leadership
 Transformation
 Coronation
 Destruction of the Outer Moon
 Pursuit
 Arrival on Junk
 Unwelcome Visitors
 The Matrix Survives
 An Unexpected Friend
 Destruction of the Inner Moon (Part I)
 Destruction of the Inner Moon (Part II)
 Ambush
 Another Leader Dies
 Rescue
 All Hope is Lost
 Unusual Allies
 The Enemy Revealed
 Seizure
 United Against the Enemy
 In the Belly of the Monster
 Their Darkest Hour
 Legacy

Lighting Their Darkest Hour

Lighting Their Darkest Hour is a soundtrack album from the film The Transformers: The Movie. It was released as an exclusive at the 2001 BotCon convention. It features the complete score from the film by the film's composer Vince DiCola. This album is considered a complete soundtrack score as it includes all the compositions heard in the final film. Tracks 7, 10, and 18 were first released on The Transformers The Movie: Original Motion Picture Soundtrack in 1986 and the rest were released on the BotCon'97 exclusive 2 disc Til All Are One album.

Track listing:
 Unicron's Theme
 TF:TM Main title (Alternate) featuring Stan Bush [track written for but not used in the final cut of the movie]
 2005
 More Luck Than You Imagine
 Attack On The Shuttle [track written for but not used in the final cut of the movie]
 Gone Fishin'
 Autobot/Decepticon Battle
 City Under Siege
 Showdown
 Death Of Optimus Prime
 Witness To A Funeral
 Contest For Leadership
 Transformation
 Coronation
 Destruction Of Moon Base One
 Destruction Of Moon Base Two (I)
 Destruction Of Moon Base Two (II)
 Escape
 Pursuit
 Arrival On Junk
 Unwelcome Visitors
 An Unexpected Friend
 The Matrix Survives
 Ambush
 Another Leader Dies
 Judgement/Rescue
 All Hope Is Lost
 Unusual Allies
 The Enemy Revealed
 Confrontation
 United Against The Enemy
 In The Belly Of The Monster
 Their Darkest Hour

The Protoform Sessions

The Protoform Sessions is a soundtrack by composer Vince DiCola. It was first released at the BotCon 2001 convention exclusive. But, it is now commercially available to buy. The album is a collection of early demos, out-takes and alternative themes from The Transformers: The Movie music score. Included are intro tracks called "Transitions" that include commentary by Vince DiCola himself. As he explains, these early recordings were produced with instrumentation that was of lower quality than that which would be heard in the final film.

Track listing:
 Greetings from Vince 
 Unicron's Theme (demo)
 Transition #1
 TF:TM Title Theme (Ed Fruge version) (0:50)
 Transition #2
 TF:TM Title Theme (Gary Falcone version)
 Transition #3
 Attack on the Shuttle (demo) (2:16)
 Transition #4
 Matrix Theme (2:19)
 Transition #5
 Dare (Gary Falcone demo) (3:59)
 Transition #6
 Escape (demo) 
 Transition #7
 No Mercy (unused TFTM song piece) (3:39)
 Transition #8
 Evil Decepticon Theme (unused TFTM song piece) (1:22)
 Transition #9
 Legacy (demo) 
 Transition #10
 Gone Fishin' Suite (3:59)
 Transition #11
 Attack on the Shuttle (BotCon 1997 concert rehearsal version) 
 Transition #12
 Death of Optimus Prime Suite (BotCon 1997 concert rehearsal version) 
 Transition #13
 Dare Suite (BotCon 1997 concert rehearsal version) (15:12)

 After the "Dare Suite", there is a hidden extra suite performance of the Rocky IV score tracks, "War" and "Montage".

Artistic Transformations: Themes and Variations

Artistic Transformations: Themes and Variations is a compilation soundtrack made up of music from The Transformers: The Movie all performed on piano by the film's composer Vince DiCola. It was first released as an exclusive at the 2001 BotCon convention. However, it is now commercially available.

Track listing:
"Unicron's Theme"
"2005"
"Attack on the Shuttle"
"Gone Fishin'"
"Autobot/Decepticon Battle"
"City Under Siege/Showdown"
"Death of Optimus Prime"
"Contest for Leadership"
"The Suite"
"Dare (excerpts)"

Compilations

Transformers: Theme Song Collection

is a two disc CD soundtrack . It was released by Columbia Music Entertainment on August 20, 2003 in Japan Only. This set features the Japanese theme songs, opening and closing, that span all of the G1, Beast era, Car Robots, and Micron Legend TV series.

Disc One:
 TRANSFORMER トランスフォーマー 
 Peace Again ピース・アゲン 
 TRANSFORMER 2010 トランスフォーマー2010
 WHAT'S YOU ホワッツ・ユー
 ザ・ヘッドマスターズ Za Heddomasutāzu / The Headmasters
 君はトランスフォーマー Kimi wa Toransufōmā / You are a Transformer
 超神マスターフォースのテーマ Chôjin Masutāfōsu no Tēma / Theme of Super God Masterforce
 燃えろ!トランスフォーマー Moero! Toransufōmā / Burn! Transformer
 トランスフォーマーV(ビクトリー) Toransufōmā V (Bikutorī) / Transformer V (Victory)
 サイバトロンばんざい Saibatoron Banzai / Cybertron Banzai, a.k.a. Hooray for the Autobots
 トランスフォーマーZのテーマ Toransufōmā Z no Tēma / Theme of Transformer Z (Zone)
 未来の君へ Mirai no ni Mukau / Head For the Future
 WAR WAR! STOP IT
 FOR THE DREAM
 GET MY FUTURE
 SUPER VOYAGER
 夢のいる場所 Yume no Iru Bashyo / Where the Dreams Are
 SPACE DREAMER―遥かなるビーストウォーズ―  SPACE DREAMER-Kanaru Bīsuto Wōzu- / Space Dreamer: Distant Beast Wars
 MY SHOOTING STAR

Disc Two:
 始まりの唄 Hajimari no Uta / Song of the Beginning
 果てしないこの宇宙(SORA)へ Hateshinai kono (Sora) e / To the Never-ending Skies
 Hello！タフネス Hello! Tafunesu / Hello! Toughness
 Love For Ever ―君を守るために― Love For Ever-Kimi o Mamoru Tame ni- / Love for Ever: To Protect You
 手の中の宇宙 Teno Naka no Uchū / The Universe in Your Hands
 あの夢の彼方へ Ano Yume no Kanata e / Off to That Dream
 WA! WA! ワンダーランド Wa! Wa! Wandārando / Wa! Wa! Wonderland
 魂のエヴォリューション Tamashii no Evoryūshon / Evolution of Spirit
 千年のソルジャー Sen-nen no Sorujā / Millennium Soldier
バ・ビ・ブ・べ　ビーストウォーズ Ba Bi Bu Be Bīsuto Wōzu / BA-BI-BU-BE Beast Wars
 HALLELUYAH
 炎のオーバードライブ ～カーロボットサイバトロン～ Honō no Ōbādoraibu ~Kārobotto Seibatoron~ / Blaze the Overdrive: Car Robot Cybertron
 マリオネット Marionette
 TRANSFORMER -Dream Again-
 Never Ending Road
 Transformers ～鋼鉄の勇気～ TRANSFORMERS~Kôtetsu no Yūki~ / Transformers: Steel of Courage
 Don't Give Up!!

Transformers: History of Music 1984–1990

Transformers: History of Music 1984–1990 (changed from the original Japanese title of 超ロボット生命体トランスフォーマー) is a five disc soundtrack boxset. It was released by Columbia Music Entertainment on March 31, 2004 in Japan only. As the title suggests, the set spans all of the Japanese G1 series. Including theme songs with corresponding karaoke versions, image score inspired by Fight! Super Robot Lifeform by composer Shiro Sagisu which was previously released in Japan as "Transformers: Original Soundtrack" in 1984. Scores straight from Headmasters, Masterforce, by composer Ishida Katsunori. Plus the Victory and Zone score which was by Michiaki Watanabe. However, this set does include the first two versions of the US opening theme song by Anne Bryant and the suites to two of the 1984 and 1985 US toy commercials. But these theme songs include their sound effects that played along with the song. Unfortunately, the original score from the "More Than Meets The Eye" series by composer Robert J. Walsh is absent from this set.

Disc One:
4TH DIMENSION
GRUESOME WARS
TRANSFORMER
CAR WALKIN’
CYBERTRON I
PEACE OF MIND
SPINNIN’
CYBERTRON II
YOU CAN FIGHT
MEChANICAL VOICE
BATTLE
WHO’S GOD
CHASE
DESTRONDecepticon
PEACE AGAIN
FUTURIST’S DREAM
TRANSFORMER(TV SIZE)
Peace Again(TV SIZE)
TRANSFORMER(OFF VOCAL VERSION)
Peace Again(OFF VOCAL VERSION)
TRANSFORMER2010(TV SIZE)
ウルトラマグナスの歌唱指導 IUrutora Magunasu no Kashôshidô Wan/Ultra Magnus' Song of Leadership I
TRANSFORMER2010(OFF VOCAL VERSION)
WHAT’S YOU(TV SIZE)
ウルトラマグナスの歌唱指導 IIUrutora Magunasu no Kashôshidô Tzu/Ultra Magnus' Song of Leadership II
WHAT’S YOU(OFF VOCAL VERSION)

Disc Two:
ザ・ヘッドマスターズZa Heddomasutāzu/The Headmasters
僕等のヘッドマスターBokutō no Heddomasutāzu/Of Our Headmasters
TRANSFORM!
臆病者同盟Okubyômomo Dômei/Coward Alliance
戦士の休息Senshi no Yasumi/Rest of a Warrior
立て!怒りのヘッドマスターTatsu! Ikari no Heddomasutāzu/Stand! Anger of a Headmaster
宇宙には国境がないUchū ni wa Kokkyō ga Nai/A Universe Without Borders
デストロン讃歌Destron Sanka/Decepticon Hymn
宇宙に架かる虹Uchū ni Kakaru Niji/A Rainbow Hanging in Space
君はトランスフォーマーKimi wa Toransufōmā/You are a Transformer
ザ・ヘッドマスターズ(OFF VOCAL VERSION)Za Heddomasutāzu/The Headmasters
TRANSFORM!(OFF VOCAL VERSION)
臆病者同盟(OFF VOCAL VERSION)Okubyômomo Dômei/Coward Alliance
戦士の休息(OFF VOCAL VERSION)Senshi no Yasumi/Rest of a Warrior
立て!怒りのヘッドマスター(OFF VOCAL VERSION)Tatsu! Ikari no Heddomasutāzu/Stand! Anger of a Headmaster
宇宙には国境がない(OFF VOCAL VERSION)Uchū ni wa Kokkyō ga Nai/A Universe Without Borders
デストロン讃歌(OFF VOCAL VERSION)Destron Sanka/Decepticon Hymn
宇宙に架かる虹(OFF VOCAL VERSION)Uchū ni Kakaru Niji/A Rainbow Hanging in Space
君はトランスフォーマー(OFF VOCAL VERSION)Kimi wa Toransufōmā/You are a Transformer

Disc Three:
超神マスターフォースのテーマChôjin Masutāfōsu no Tēma/Theme of Super God Masterforce
進め!超神マスターフォースShinpo! Chôjin Masutāfōsu/Advance! Super God Masterforce
奇跡のトランスフォーマーKiseki no Toransufōmā/Transformer of Miracles
変身!ゴッドマスターHenshin! Goddomasutā/Transform! God Master
小さな勇士~ヘッドマスターJRのテーマ~Chiisai Senshi~Heddomasutāzu JR no Tēma~/Little Warrior: Theme of Headmasters JR
スーパージンライのテーマSūpā Ginrai no Tēma/Theme of Super Ginrai
See See シーコンズSee See Sīkonzu/See See Seacon
宇宙の支配者・デビルZUchū no Shihaisha: Debiru Z/Ruler of the Universe: Devil Z
WE BELIEVE TOMORROW
燃えろ!トランスフォーマーMoero! Toransufōmā/Burn! Transformer
超神マスターフォースのテーマ(OFF VOCAL VERSION)Chôjin Masutāfōsu no Tēma/Theme of Super God Masterforce
進め!超神マスターフォース(OFF VOCAL VERSION)Shinpo! Chôjin Masutāfōsu/Advance! Super God Masterforce
奇跡のトランスフォーマー(OFF VOCAL VERSION)Kiseki no Toransufōmā/Transformer of Miracles
変身!ゴッドマスター(OFF VOCAL VERSION)Henshin! Goddomasutā/Transform! God Master
小さな勇士~ヘッドマスターJRのテーマ~(OFF VOCAL VERSION)Chiisai Senshi~Heddomasutâzu JR no Tēma~/Little Warrior: Theme of Headmasters JR
スーパージンライのテーマ(OFF VOCAL VERSION)Sūpā Ginrai no Tēma/Theme of Super Ginrai
See See シーコンズ(OFF VOCAL VERSION)See See Sīkonzu/See See Seacon
宇宙の支配者・デビルZ(OFF VOCAL VERSION)Uchū no Shihaisha: Debiru Z/Ruler of the Universe: Devil Z
WE BELIEVE TOMORROW(OFF VOCAL VERSION)
燃えろ!トランスフォーマー(OFF VOCAL VERSION)Moero! Toransufōmā/Burn! Transformer

Disc Four:
ザ・ヘッドマスターズ(TV SIZE)Za Heddomasutāzu/The Headmasters
西暦2011年Seireki 2011 Nen/Year 2011 AD
マトリクスを探せ!Matorikusu o Sagasu!/Look for the Matrix!
夢のダブルコンボイ誕生Yume no Daburu Konboi Tanjô/Dream of the Birth of Double Convoy
ヘッドオン!!フォートレスマキシマスHetudo On!! Fōtoresu Makisimasu/Head On! Fortress Maximusザ・ヘッドマスターズ(INSTRUMENTAL VERSION)Za Heddomasutāzu/The Headmasters戦え!フォートレスマキシマスTatakai! Fōtoresu Makisimasu/Fight! Fortress Maximus君はトランスフォーマー(INSTRUMENTAL VERSION)Kimi wa Toransufōmā/You are a Transformerデストロン最終計画発動Destron Saishū Keikaku Ugoki/Decepticons Final Plan Goes Into Action最後の地球大決戦Saigo no Chikyū Kettei-teki Tatakai/Last of Earth's Decisive Battles予告編用音楽Yokoku-hen yô Ongaku/Music for Preview君はトランスフォーマー(TV SIZE)Kimi wa Toransufōmā/You are a Transformer超神マスターフォースのテーマ(TV SIZE)Chôjin Masutāfōsu no Tēma/Theme of Super God Masterforceデストロン復活Destron Fukkatsu/Decepticon Revival燃えろ!トランスフォーマー(INSTRUMENTAL VERSION)Moero! Toransufōmā/Burn! Transformer立て!!プリテンダーTatsu!! Puritendā/Stand! Pretender超神マスターフォースのテーマ(INSTRUMENTAL VERSION)Chôjin Masutāfōsu no Tēma/Theme of Super God Masterforceその名はジンライSono na ha Ginrai/His Name is Ginraiジンライ怒りのゴッドオン!!Ginrai Ikari no Gotudo On!!/Angry God on of Ginrai!!月面の死闘Desperate Struggle on the Surface of Moon竒跡のトランスフォーマー(INSTRUMENTAL VERSION)Kiseki no Toransufōmā/Transformer of Miraclesゴッドジンライの帰還Gotudo Ginrai no Kitaku/Return of God Ginrai戦闘……そしてSentô...Sosite/Battle...and then進め!超神マスターフォース(INSTRUMENTAL VERSION)Susume! Chōjin Masutāfōsu/Advance! Super God Masterforceファイナルファイヤーガッツ!Fuainaru Fuaiyā Gatusu/Final Fire Guts!予告編用音楽Yokoku-hen yô Ongaku/Music for Previews燃えろ!トランスフォーマー(TV SIZE)Moero! Toransufōmā/Burn! TransformerDisc Five:
トランスフォーマーV(TV SIZE)Toransufōmā V/Transformer V宇宙の勇者・スターセイバーUchū no Yūsha Sutā Seibā/Star Saber: Hero of the Universeビクトリー戦争開始!Bikutorī Sensô Kaishiten!/Victory War, Start!マイクロ星・謎の戦士Maikuro-sei Nazo no Senshi/Micron Planet: Warriors of Mystery合体!ライオカイザーGattai! Raio Kaizā/Unite! Lio Kaizerビクトリーレオ誕生Bikutorī Reo Tanjô/Birth of Victory Leo逆転!必殺のビクトリー合体Gyakuten! Hissatsu no Bikutorī Gattai/Inversion! Final Blow of the Victory Uniteデストロン巨大要塞Destron Kyodai Yôsai/ Decepticon Giant FortスターセイバーVSデスザラスSutā Seibā VS Desuzarasu/Star Saber VS DeathsaurusトランスフォーマーV(INSTRUMENTAL VERSION)Toransufomā V/Transformer Vサイバトロンばんざい(INSTRUMENTAL VERSION)Saibatoron Banzai/Cybertron Banzai勝利のスターセイバーShôri no Sutā Seibā/Victory of Star Saberサイバトロンばんざい(TV SIZE)Saibatoron Banzai/Cybertron BanzaiトランスフォーマーV(OFF VOCAL VERSION)Toransufōmā V/Transformer Vサイバトロンばんざい(OFF VOCAL VERSION)Saibatoron Banzai/Cybertron BanzaiトランスフォーマーZのテーマ(ONE CHORUS VERSION)Toransufōmā Z no Tēma/Theme of Transformer Z未来の君へ(ONE CHORUS VERSION)Mirai no ni Mukau/Head For the FutureトランスフォーマーZのテーマ(INSTRUMENTAL VERSION)Toransufōmā Z no Tēma/Theme of Transformer Z未来の君へ(INSTRUMENTAL VERSION)Mirai no ni Mukau/Head For the FutureトランスフォーマーZのテーマ(OFF VOCAL VERSION)Toransufōmā Z no Tēma/Theme of Transformer Z未来の君へ(OFF VOCAL VERSION)Mirai no ni Mukau/Head For the FutureTHE TRANSFORMERS(VERSION 1)
THE TRANSFORMERS(VERSION 2)
THE TRANSFORMERS TVCF用音楽(VERSION 1)
THE TRANSFORMERS TVCF用音楽(VERSION 2)
SURVIVAL

Transformers: Song Universe

 is a five disc compilation soundtrack box set. It was released by Columbia Music Entertainment, inc. on August 8, 2007 in Japan only. Unlike the previous set History of Music which focuses on compositions from the G1 series this set contains every Japanese vocal song from G1 through Galaxy Force along with the then recent "Kiss Players♥" radio dramas and karaoke versions of the featured theme songs and bonus songs that were exclusive to each theme song's single release. Its release coincided with the live action Transformers film's Japanese release.

Disc One:
Transformer
Peace Again
Transformer 2010
What's You
ザ・ヘッドマスターズZa Heddomasutāzu/The Headmasters僕等のヘッドマスターBokutō no Heddomasutāzu/Of Our HeadmastersTransform!
臆病者同盟Okubyōmono Dōmei/Coward's Alliance戦士の休息Senshi no Kyūsoku/The Soldier's Rest立て!怒りのヘッドマスターTate! Ikari no Heddomasutāzu/Stand! The Angry Headmasters宇宙には国境がないUchū ni wa Kokkyō ga Nai/A Universe Without Bordersデストロン讃歌Destron Sanka/Decepticon Hymn宇宙に架かる虹Uchū ni Kakaru Niji/A Rainbow Hanging in Space君はトランスフォーマーKimi wa Toransufōmā/You Are a TransformerTRANSFORMER～トランスフォーマーキスぷれバージョン～Transformer~Toransufōmā Kisu Pure Bājion~/Transformer: Transformer Kiss Players VersionDisc Two:
超神マスターフォースのテーマChōjin Masutāfōsu no Tēma/Theme of Super God Masterforce進め!超神マスターフォースSusume! Chōjin Masutāfōsu/Advance! Super God Masterforce奇跡のトランスフォーマーKiseki no Toransufōmā/Transformer of Miracles変身!ゴッドマスターHenshin! Goddomasutā/Transform! God Master小さな勇士～ヘットマスターJRのテーマ～Chiisana Yūshi~Heddomasutāzu Junia no Tēma~/Little Brave Warriors: Theme of Headmasters Jr.スーパージンライのテーマSupā Jinrai no Tēma/Theme of Super GinraiSee See シーコンズSee See Sīkonzu/See See Seacons宇宙の支配者・デビルZUchū no Shihaisha Debiru Zetto/Ruler of the Universe Devil ZWE BELIEVE TOMORROW
燃えろ!トランスフォーマーMoero! Toransufōmā/Burn! TransformerトランスフォーマーVToransufōmā Bi/Transformer VサイバトロンばんざいSaibatoron Banzai/Autobots BanzaiトランスフォーマーZのテーマToransufōmā Zetto no Tēma/Theme of Transformer Z未来の君へAshita no Kimi e/To the You of TomorrowWar War! Stop It
Can We Play Off
For the Dream
For the Dream (Extended super remix)

Disc Three:
Get My Future
Silent Moon
Super Voyager
Thank You, Mama
夢のいる場所Yume no Iro Basho/The Place Where Dreams Areこんな気持ちKonna Kimochi/Such FeelingsGet My Future (Full Power Trance Mix)
Super Voyager (Universal Doctor Mix)
Space Dreamer ～遥かなるビーストウォーズ～Space Dreamer~Haruka naru Bīsuto Wōzu~/Space Dreamer: Distant Beast WarsMy Shooting Star
始まりの唄Hajimari no Uta/Song of The Beginning果てしないこの宇宙へHateshinai no Kono Sora E/Toward This Neverending SkyHello!タフネスHello! Tafunesu/Hello! ToughnessLove For Ever ～君を守るために～Love For Ever~Kimi wo Mamoru Tame ni~/Love Forever: In Order to Protect YouDa Da Da
手の中の宇宙Te no Naka no Uchū/The Universe in My Handmagique musique

Disc Four:
あの夢の彼方へAno Yume no Kanata e/To That Dream Over ThereWA! WA! ワンダーランドWa! Wa! Wandārando/Wa! Wa! Wonderland魂のエヴォリューションTamashii no Evoryūshon/Evolution of the Soulバ・ビ・ブ・ベ ビーストウォーズBa Bi Bu Be Bīsuto Wōzu/Ba Bi Bu Be Beast Wars千年のソルジャーSennen no Sorujā/Soldier of the MillenniumHalleluyah
炎のオーバードライブ～カーロボットサイバトロン～Honō no Ōbādoraibu~Kārobotto Saibatoron~/Blaze the Overdrive: Car Robot Cybertron君色の未来Kimi Iro no Yume/The Future of Your ColorsマリオネットMarionetto/MarionetteMidnight Cinderella
TRANSFORMER-Dream Again
胸いっぱいの・・・Mune Ippai no.../Chest Full of...Never Ending Road
No Name Heroes
Transformers～鋼鉄の勇気～Transformers~Kōtetsu no Yūki~/Transformers: Steel of CourageDon't Give Up!
SURVIVAL

Disc Five:
太陽のtransform!!Taiyō no Transform!!/Solar Transform!!Calling you
Call You ・・・君と僕の未来Call You... Kimi to Boku no Mirai/Call You... The Future of Me and YouいつもItsumo/AlwaysIgnition -イグニッション!Ignition-Igunisshon!/Ignition: Ignition!Growing up!!
メガトロン音頭Megatoron Ondo/Megatron MarchWar War! Stop It オリジナル・カラオケ）War War! Stop It (Orijinaru Karaoke)/War War! Stop It (Original Karaoke)For the Dream（オリジナル・カラオケ）For the Dream (Orijinaru Karaoke)/For the Dream (Original Karaoke)Get My Future（オリジナル・カラオケ）Get My Future (Orijinaru Karaoke)/Get My Future (Original Karaoke)Super Voyager（オリジナル・カラオケ）Super Voyager (Orijinaru Karaoke)/Super Voyager (Original Karaoke)夢のいる場所 （オリジナル・カラオケ）Yume no Iro Basho (Orijinaru Karaoke)/The Place Where Dreams Are (Original Karaoke)Love For Ever ～君を守るために～ （オリジナル・カラオケ）Love For Ever~Kimi wo Mamoru Tame Ni~(Orizinaru Karaoke)/Love Forever: In Order to Protect You (Original Karaoke)手の中の宇宙 （オリジナル・カラオケ）Te no Naka no Uchū (Orijinaru Karaoke)/The Universe in My Hand (Original Karaoke)魂のエヴォリューション （オリジナル・カラオケ）Tamashii no Evoryūshon (Orizinaru Karaoke)/Evolution of the Soul (Original Karaoke)バ・ビ・ブ・ベ ビーストウォーズ （オリジナル・カラオケ）Ba Bi Bu Be Bīsuto Wōzu (Orizinaru Karaoke)/Ba Bi Bu Be Beast Wars (Original Karaoke)千年のソルジャー （オリジナル・カラオケ）Sennen no Sorujā (Orijinaru Karaoke)/Soldier of the Millennium (Original Karaoke)
Halleluyah（オリジナル・カラオケ）Halleluyah (Orijinaru Karaoke)/Halleluyah (Original Karaoke)

Live-action film series
 Transformers: The Album
 Transformers: The Score
 Transformers: Revenge of the Fallen – The Album
 Transformers: Revenge of the Fallen – The Score
 Transformers: Dark of the Moon – The Album
 Transformers: Dark of the Moon – The Score
 Transformers: Age of Extinction – The Score
 Transformers: The Last Knight – Music from the Motion Picture

References

 
Audio
Film and television discographies